"Wrapped Up in You" is a song written by Wayne Kirkpatrick and recorded by American country music artist Garth Brooks. It was released in October 2001 as the second single from his eighth studio album Scarecrow. It reached number 5 on the Billboard Country Charts in 2002 and number 46 on the Billboard Hot 100.

Content
"Wrapped Up In You" is a love song. A man expresses his love for a special someone using various analogies and describing how she supports him in hard times and how his life would be if she weren't around. The song doesn't feature any drums, but does have traces of percussion (such as maracas). It is in the key G Major.

Music video
The song's music video opens with a quartet of old men at a barbershop executing unique and moderately complex percussions, using household objects such as a broom, board game piece, newspaper etc. while Garth and back-up band arrive for a bite to eat. Garth and co. can't get in the restaurant but notice the old men's performance. They pick-up some instruments lying about and join them to perform the song. A small group of women appear near the end of the song and observe the men's performance. This video was directed by Jon Small, and was shot in Watertown, Tennessee.

Chart positions
"Wrapped Up in You" debuted at number 22 on the U.S. Billboard Hot Country Singles & Tracks for the chart week of October 27, 2001.

Year-end charts

Personnel
Compiled from liner notes.
Sam Bacco — drums, percussion
Garth Brooks — vocals
Gordon Kennedy, Wayne Kirkpatrick — acoustic guitars
Jimmy Mattingly — fiddle
Terry McMillan — harmonica
Jimmie Lee Sloas — bass guitar

References

External links
"Wrapped Up In You" Lyrics

2001 singles
Garth Brooks songs
Songs written by Wayne Kirkpatrick
Song recordings produced by Allen Reynolds
Capitol Records Nashville singles
2001 songs